Ayşe Kil (born 9 July 1972) is a Turkish sport shooter. She tied for 25th place in the women's 25 metre pistol event at the 2000 Summer Olympics.

References

1972 births
Living people
Turkish female sport shooters
Olympic shooters of Turkey
Shooters at the 2000 Summer Olympics